Muhammad Rian Firmansyah (born 16 December 1998) is an Indonesian professional footballer who plays as a right winger for Liga 2 club Persipal Palu.

Club career

Sarawak FA
He was signed for Sarawak FA from Persipon to play in the Malaysia Premier League on 15 January 2019.

Bali United
On 15 September 2019, Rian officially signed a year and a half contract with Bali United. He signed after a month trial and had chance to prove himself in Trofeo Hamengku Buwono X. Bali United registered him for 2019 Liga 1 to completes the quota of U-23 players, because Hanis Saghara Putra still out injured.

He played his first official match for Bali United in Liga 1 when he came as a substitute for Irfan Bachdim in a match against Arema on 16 December 2019.

PSM Makassar
In 2021, Rian Firmansyah signed a contract with Indonesian Liga 1 club PSM Makassar. Rian made his debut on 5 September 2021 as a substitute in a match against Arema at the Pakansari Stadium, Cibinong.

Career statistics

Club

Honours

Club
Bali United
 Liga 1: 2019

References

External links 
 

1998 births
Living people
Indonesian footballers
Sarawak FA players
Bali United F.C. players
Association football wingers
Indonesian expatriate footballers
People from Pontianak
Sportspeople from West Kalimantan